The British Academy Television Award for Best Factual Series or Strand is one of the major categories of the British Academy Television Awards (BAFTAs), the primary awards ceremony of the British television industry. The category is described on the official BAFTA website as "more than one factual programme linked through a unified approach, narrative or the thematic development of a subject matter."

Throughout the history of the awards there have been several categories with different names for factual television programming.
 From 1958 to 1969 was presented as an individual award named Best Factual while also from 1964 to 1966 other category was presented as Best Factual Personality.
 In 1971 and 1972 was awarded as Best Factual Production and then from 1973 to 1977 as Best Factual Programme.
 Finally since 1973 it has been awarded under the name of Best Factual Series or Best Factual Series or Strand.

Winners and nominees

1950s
Best Factual'

1960s
Best Factual

Best Factual Personality

1970s
Best Factual Production

Best Factual Programme

Best Factual Series

1980s
Best Factual Series

1990s
Best Factual Series

2000s
Best Factual Series or Strand

2010s

2020s

Note: The series that don't have recipients on the tables had Production team credited as recipients for the award or nomination.

References

Factual Series or Strand